The Henry Samueli School of Engineering (HSSoE) is the academic unit of the University of California, Irvine (UC Irvine) that oversees academic research and teaching in disciplines of the field of engineering. Established when the campus opened in 1965, the school consists of five departments, each of which is involved in academic research in its specific field, as well as several interdisciplinary fields. The school confers Bachelor of Science, Master of Science, and Doctor of Philosophy degrees.

According to the UC Irvine academic catalogue, HSSoE research areas include: biochemical and bioreactor engineering, earthquake engineering, water resources, transportation, parallel and distributed computer systems, intelligent systems and neural networks, image and signal processing, opto-electronic devices and materials, high-frequency devices and systems, integrated micro and nanoscale systems, fuel cell technology, fluid mechanics, combustion and jet propulsion, materials processing, robotics, and modern control theory.

In 2000, the school, along with its counterpart at the University of California, Los Angeles (UCLA), were renamed in honor of Henry Samueli, co-founder of Irvine-based Broadcom Corporation, for his 1999 donations of $20 million and $30 million to the schools of engineering at UC Irvine and UCLA, respectively.

The most recent permanent Dean of the HSSoE was Gregory Washington, who held the position from August 1, 2011 until July 1, 2020 when he resigned in order to accept appointment as President of George Mason University. Michael Green currently serves as interim dean, and Magnus Egerstedt will take over as dean in July 2021.

Departments
 Biomedical Engineering (BME)
 Chemical Engineering and Biomolecular Engineering (CBE) 
 Civil and Environmental Engineering (CEE) 
 Electrical Engineering and Computer Science (EECS)
 Mechanical and Aerospace Engineering (MAE)
 Materials Science and Engineering (MSE)

Degrees conferred
Each of the five departments confers Bachelor of Science, Master of Science, and Doctor of Philosophy degrees. The School of Engineering also offers a general B.S. degree in Engineering to upper-division students who wish to pursue an interdisciplinary program of study spanning more than one of the engineering departments, or a program not offered by one of the departments such as hydrology or project management.

The School of Engineering offers interdisciplinary degrees in conjunction with the Donald Bren School of Information and Computer Sciences: a B.S. in Computer Science and Engineering, and M.S. and Ph.D. in Networked Systems.

Most, but not all, undergraduate degree programs are accredited by ABET. The first program to receive accreditation was Electrical Engineering in 1968; the most recent was Biomedical Engineering in 2008. Programs not accredited include two of the aforementioned interdisciplinary degrees (general Engineering, Networked Systems).

Research centers

In keeping with the University of California's primary mission as a research institution, all of the HSSoE's departments are  involved in academic research. Additionally, HSSoE faculty and students are involved with several interdisciplinary research centers affiliated with UCI, other academic, research, or medical institutions, government agencies, and private industry. These research centers include:
Advanced Power and Energy Program (APEP) 
Beckman Laser Institute
California Institute for Telecommunications and Information Technology (Calit2)
Carl Zeiss Center of Excellence for Electron Microscopy
Center for Advanced Monitoring and Damage Inspection (CAMDI)
Center for Biomedical Signal Processing and Computation (CBMSPC)
Center for Embedded Computer Systems
Center for Engineering Science in Design
Center for Hydrometeorology and Remote Sensing (CHRS)
Center for Pervasive Communications and Computing
Chao Family Comprehensive Cancer Center
The Edwards Lifesciences Center for Advanced Cardiovascular Technology
Gavin Herbert Eye Institute
Integrated Nanosystems Research Facility (INRF)
Institute for Clinical and Translational Science (ICTS)
Institute of Transportation Studies
Lasers, Flames, and Aerosols Laboratory (LFA) 
Laboratory for Fluorescence Dynamics (LFD)
LifeChips
Materials Characterization Center (MC2)
Micro/Nano Fluidics Fundamentals Focus Center (MF3)
National Fuel Cell Research Center (NFCRC)
Networked Systems Center
RapidTech, National Center for Rapid Technologies
Sue and Bill Gross Stem Cell Research Center
UCI Combustion Laboratory
Urban Water Research Center (UWRC)

Facilities

Most of the school's facilities occupy one of the "spokes" of the UC Irvine campus' "Ring Road", its main  circular pedestrian mall on which the university's academic schools (except for Arts, Business, and Medicine) are situated. This includes department offices, faculty offices, laboratories, classrooms and lecture halls, and a number of research facilities. Architecturally speaking, the school consists of a buildings ranging from brutalist to postmodern.

The brutalist Engineering Tower, designed by the Los Angeles firm Kistner, Wright & Wright and constructed in 1969-1970 during the campus' original building boom, is the tallest building on the main campus. It is noted for its cantilevered design which makes it nearly twice as wide at the top than at the base. Most of the remaining buildings, including the postmodern Engineering Gateway and flagship Calit2 facility, were built during the campus building boom that has lasted from the late 1980s until the present. The school also has portable classroom buildings that house classrooms, laboratories, and offices.

For many years Engineering shared some facilities with the Department of Information and Computer Science (ICS), including the Frank Gehry-designed ICS/Engineering Research Facility (IERF). However, following ICS' 2002 elevation to school status, as well as its 2004 endowment from Orange County real estate mogul Donald Bren, ICS moved many of its laboratories and offices out of shared space into the newly constructed Bren Hall located between Engineering and the Physical Sciences. IERF was demolished in 2007 and Engineering Hall was built in its place.

Figures
Founded as the School of Engineering in 1965 with just two faculty members and 75 students declaring engineering majors; the school today serves more than 4,500 students (3,598 undergraduates and 951 graduates) enrolled in 12 undergraduate degree majors and 13 graduate degree programs. The school was renamed The Henry Samueli School of Engineering in 1999 after Samueli, co-founder, chairman and chief technical officer of Broadcom Inc., made a generous donation.

Faculty members are scholars and leaders in their disciplines and have achieved worldwide honors and recognition for their pioneering research and dedicated teaching. Nearly a third are fellows in professional societies, and 13 are members of the National Academy of Engineering. The school has nine endowed chairs, seven Distinguished Professors and four Chancellor's Professors.

The school's emphasis on hands-on learning is attracting high-achieving students who want more than a classroom experience. This year's class of incoming freshmen had the highest-ever average SAT score of 1,980 and an average GPA of 4.09. Thirty-nine percent are first-generation college students and 27 percent are from low-income families. This past year, the school granted 805 bachelor's degrees, 284 master's degrees and 87 doctorates.

Undergraduate and graduate student diversity is a key initiative for the Samueli School, with efforts to increase both underrepresented students and women. The school is actively involved in STEM outreach, from teacher training and a variety of K-12 programs to a collaboration with local community colleges.

Research is integral to the school's mission to educate students and benefit society. Engineering faculty pursue investigations that are timely, socially responsible and forward thinking. They work in partnership with industry and state and federal agencies to promote the transfer of research to applications that improve lives. More than two-thirds of undergraduate students actively participate in faculty-led projects. Current research thrusts include communications and information technology, human health, energy and sustainability, and advanced manufacturing and materials.

The Samueli School of Engineering is ranked 21st in U.S. News & World Report's current listing of best public engineering graduate schools. Its undergraduate program is ranked 27th among publics. Rankings are based on a survey of engineering deans and senior faculty at ABET-accredited programs in which a doctorate is the terminal degree.

Private support from the community, alumni and corporations grew to $35.8 million in 2016–17. Gifts to the Samueli School help fund scholarships and fellowships for students, exciting research activities being conducted by faculty and graduate students, STEM outreach and critical academic programs.

Notable faculty
Satya N. Atluri, distinguished professor of Mechanical and Aerospace Engineering
Michael W. Berns, professor of Biomedical Engineering
Daniel Gajski, The Henry Samueli "Turing" Endowed Chair in Computer Systems Design, professor of Electrical Engineering and Computer Science
Enrico Gratton, professor of Biomedical Engineering
Payam Heydari, professor of Electrical Engineering and Computer Science
Syed Ali Jafar, professor of Electrical Engineering and Computer Science
Hamid Jafarkhani, professor of Electrical Engineering and Computer Science
Michelle Khine, associate professor of Biomedical Engineering
Abraham P. Lee, professor of Biomedical Engineering and Mechanical and Aerospace Engineering
G.P. Li, professor of Electrical Engineering and Computer Science
Robert H. Liebeck, adjunct professor of Mechanical and Aerospace Engineering
James H. Mulligan Jr., former dean and professor of Electrical Engineering
Henry Samueli, adjunct professor of Electrical Engineering and Computer Science
Scott Samuelsen, professor of Mechanical and Aerospace Engineering
Frank Shi, professor of Chemical Engineering, Electrical Engineering, Materials Science and Computer Science
Soroosh Sorooshian, distinguished professor of Civil and Environmental Engineering and Earth System Science
Lee Swindlehurst, professor of Electrical Engineering and Computer Science
Bruce J. Tromberg, professor of Biomedical Engineering and of Surgery and Physiology and Biophysics (School of Medicine)
Jasper A. Vrugt, assistant professor of Civil and Environmental Engineering
H. Kumar Wickramasinghe,  professor of Electrical Engineering and Computer Science
Albert F. Yee, professor of Chemical Engineering and Materials Science

See also
 Engineering education

References

External links

University of California, Irvine
Henry
Engineering schools and colleges in the United States
1965 establishments in California
Educational institutions established in 1965
Science and technology in Greater Los Angeles